A faculty is a division within a university or college comprising one subject area or a group of related subject areas, possibly also delimited by level (e.g. undergraduate). In American usage such divisions are generally referred to as colleges (e.g., "college of arts and sciences") or schools (e.g., "school of business"), but may also mix terminology (e.g., Harvard University has a "faculty of arts and sciences" but a "law school").

History
The medieval University of Bologna, which served as a model for most of the later medieval universities in Europe, had four faculties: students began at the Faculty of Arts, graduates from which could then continue at the higher Faculties of Theology, Law, and Medicine. The privilege to establish these four faculties was usually part of medieval universities’ charters, but not every university could do so in practice.

The Faculty of Arts took its name from the seven liberal arts: the trivium (grammar, rhetoric, dialectics) and the quadrivium (arithmetic, music, geometry and astronomy). In German, Scandinavian, Slavic and related universities, it would more often be called the Faculty of Philosophy. The degree of Magister Artium (Master of Arts) derives its name from the Faculty of Arts, while the degree of Doctor Philosophiae (Doctor of Philosophy) derives its name from the Faculty of Philosophy, German name of the same faculty. Whether called Faculty of Arts or Faculty of Philosophy, it taught a range of subjects with general and fundamental applicability.

The higher Faculty of Law and Faculty of Medicine were intended, much like today, for specialized education required for professions. The Faculty of Theology was the most prestigious, as well as least common in the first 500 years—and generally one that popes sought most to control. Although also "professional" education for clergy, theology (until the Enlightenment) was also seen as the ultimate subject at universities, named "The Queen of the Sciences", and often set the example for the other faculties.

The number of faculties has usually multiplied in modern universities, both through subdivisions of the traditional four faculties and through the absorption of academic disciplines that developed within originally vocational schools, in areas such as engineering or agriculture.

Faculty of Arts 

A traditional division of the teaching bodies of medieval universities (the others being Law, Medicine and Theology), the Faculty of Arts was the lowest in rank but also the largest (the higher faculties admitted only Arts graduates). Instead of "Arts", this faculty often had the name "Philosophy". Nowadays this is still a common name for faculties teaching humanities (e.g.,)).

Faculty of Classics 
A Faculty of Classics may be focused on ancient history and ancient literature. The title may refer to the following faculties:

 Faculty of Classics, University of Cambridge
 Faculty of Classics, University of Oxford

Faculty of Commerce 
Faculty of Commerce examples include:

 Faculty of Commerce: Banaras Hindu University
 Faculty of Commerce: University of Wollongong
 Faculty of Commerce, Social Welfare & Business Management: University of Calcutta
 Faculty of Commerce and Accountancy: Thammasat University

Faculty of Economics 
Faculty of Economics (Ekonomski fakultet in most South Slavic languages) may refer to, amongst others:

 MSU Faculty of Economics, located in Moscow, Russia
 University of Belgrade Faculty of Economics, located in Belgrade, Serbia
 University of Montenegro Faculty of Economics, located in Podgorica, Montenegro
 Faculty of Economics and Business, University of Zagreb, located in Zagreb, Croatia
 University of Osijek Faculty of Economics, located in Osijek, Croatia
 School of Economics and Business Sarajevo, located in Sarajevo, Bosnia and Herzegovina
 University of Kragujevac Faculty of Economics, located in Kragujevac, Serbia
 Makerere University School of Economics, located in Kampala, Uganda

Faculty of Education 
Faculty of Education examples include:

 Faculty of Education, Banaras Hindu University
 Faculty of Education, McGill University
 Faculty of Education, Queen's University
 Faculty of Education, University of Cambridge
 Faculty of Education, University of Colombo
 Faculty of Education, University of London
 Faculty of Education, University of Osijek
 Faculty of Education, University of Strathclyde
 Faculty of Education, University of Western Ontario
 Faculty of Education, University of Zagreb
 Faculty of Education, Victoria University of Wellington

Other faculties
 Faculty of Education and Social Work, University of Sydney
 Faculty of Education, Law and Social Sciences (Birmingham City University)

Faculty of Engineering 
Faculty of Engineering examples include:

 Faculty of Engineering, University of Kragujevac
Faculty of Electrical Engineering and Computing, University of Zagreb
 Faculty of Earth Sciences and Technology, Bandung Institute of Technology 
Faculty of SIET Nilokheri

Faculty of Graduate Studies 
The title, Faculty of Graduate Studies, refers not to a specific area of study, but to a Graduate school. Examples include:

Faculty of Graduate Studies, of the University of Colombo
Faculty of Graduate Studies, of the Brock University
Faculty of Graduate Studies and Research, of the Carleton University 
Faculty of Graduate Studies, of the University of Kelaniya

Faculty of Humanities 
A Faculty of Humanities is a university faculty teaching humanities.

Examples include:

Faculty of Humanities, University of Mostar, Bosnia and Herzegovina
AAU Faculty of Humanities, Aalborg University, Aalborg, Denmark
University of the Witwatersrand Faculty of Humanities, Johannesburg, South Africa
Faculty of Humanities, Kasetsart University, Bangkok, Thailand

Faculty of Information Technology 
A Faculty of Information Technology is a university faculty teaching information technology.

Examples include:

 Faculty of Information Technology, Polytechnic University of Tirana
 Faculty of Information Technology, University Džemal Bijedić of Mostar
 Faculty of Information Technology, Czech Technical University in Prague

Faculty of Law

A Faculty of Law is a university faculty teaching law, or a law school faculty.

Examples include:

Faculty of Law: Aligarh Muslim University
Faculty of Law: Banaras Hindu University
Faculty of Law: Chinese University of Hong Kong
Faculty of Law: Göttingen University
Faculty of Law: Hebrew University of Jerusalem
Faculty of Law: Heidelberg University
Faculty of Law: Istanbul Commerce University
Faculty of Law: Islamic Azad University, Ahvaz Branch
Faculty of Law: Lakehead University
Faculty of Law: McGill University
Faculty of Law: Monash University
Faculty of Law: National University of Singapore
Faculty of Law: Queen's University
Faculty of Law: Saint Petersburg State University
Faculty of Law: Thammasat University
Faculty of Law: Thompson Rivers University
Faculty of Law: Université de Montréal
Faculty of Law: University of Alberta
Faculty of Law: University of Belgrade
Faculty of Law: University of British Columbia
Faculty of Law: University of Calcutta
Faculty of Law: University of Calgary
Faculty of Law: University of Cambridge
Faculty of Law: University of Colombo
Faculty of Law: University of Copenhagen
Faculty of Law: University of Delhi
Faculty of Law: University of Hong Kong
Faculty of Law: Istanbul Medeniyet University
Faculty of Law: University of Ljubljana
Faculty of Law: University of Montenegro
Faculty of Law: University of Mostar
Faculty of Law: University of National and World Economy
Faculty of Law: University of New Brunswick
Faculty of Law: University of Osijek
Faculty of Law: University of Oslo
Faculty of Law: University of Otago
Faculty of Law: University of Ottawa
Faculty of Law: University of Oxford
Faculty of Law: University of Paris-XII
Faculty of Law: University of Pretoria
Faculty of Law: University of Sarajevo
Faculty of Law: University of Tasmania
Faculty of Law: University of Toronto
Faculty of Law: University of Victoria
Faculty of Law: University of Waikato
Faculty of Law: University of Windsor
Faculty of Law: University of Zagreb
Faculty of Law: Victoria University of Wellington

Others
Faculty of Civil Law, University of Santo Tomas
Faculty of Education, Law and Social Sciences (Birmingham City University)
Faculty of International Law, CUPL
Faculty of Law and Administration, Jagiellonian University
Faculty of Law and Public Administration, University of Szeged

Faculty of Management Studies 
A Faculty of Management Studies is a university division teaching management studies.

Examples include:
 Faculty of Management Studies, Banaras Hindu University
 Faculty of Management Studies (Delhi), University of Delhi
 FMS Baroda, Maharaja Sayajirao University of Baroda
 FMS Udaipur, Mohanlal Sukhadia University

Faculty of Music 
In English-speaking academia, Faculty of Music normally refers to a university department, especially at Oxford and Cambridge (UK). In the US, the use of 'faculty' often relates to academic and teaching staff.

Examples include:

Faculty of Music, University of Cambridge
Faculty of Music, Academy of Performing Arts in Prague

Faculty of Natural Sciences 

Faculty of Natural Sciences examples include

 Imperial College Faculty of Natural Sciences, England
 Comenius University, Faculty of Natural Sciences, Slovakia
 Vilnius University Faculty of Natural Sciences, Lithuania

Faculty of Philosophy 
A Faculty of Philosophy is a university faculty teaching philosophy.

In the universities of continental Europe, the Faculty of Arts has more often been named the equivalent of "Faculty of Philosophy" (e.g.). Nowadays this is a common name for the faculties teaching humanities.

Examples include:

Faculty of Philosophy, University of Cambridge
Faculty of Philosophy, University of Oxford
Faculty of Philosophy, University of Belgrade
Faculty of Philosophy, University of Montenegro
Faculty of Philosophy, University of Niš
Faculty of Philosophy, University of Zagreb

Faculty of Political Science 

Faculty of Political Science examples include:

 Faculty of Political Science in Sarajevo, Bosnia and Herzegovina
 Faculty of Political Sciences, University of Belgrade, Serbia
 MSU Faculty of Political Science, Moscow State University, Russia
 Faculty of Political Science, Ankara University, Turkey
 Faculty of Political Sciences, University of Montenegro
 Faculty of Political Science, Chulalongkorn University
 Faculty of Political Science, Thammasat University

Notes and References

Notes

References